We Are...The League is the debut album by English punk rock band, the Anti-Nowhere League.

Reception

From contemporary reviews, Ken Tucker of The Philadelphia Inquirer gave the album a four star out of five rating stating that it was "the most viscous mean-spirited, gratuitously violent punk band to come down the pike in a long time." and stated the album was for "mature adults, this is the best hard-core punk record England has yielded since the Sex Pistols era. Every song features a slamming, inescapable beat to match the freely flung obscenities." Carol Clerk of Melody Maker and Garry Bushell of Sounds noted that the music was hard to take seriously due to how over the top it was. Clerk found that "It's so far over the top it's in orbit, uttering the unutterable at every opportunity, yelling a defiant "eff off" at everybody and everything. It's so extreme, it's impossible to take offence. Take the League seriously and the joke's on you, mate."  while Bushell found that "this just ain't the sort of music to lend itself to sensitive in-depth philosophical probings." and that "the only way the album can be appreciated is to knock back half a litre of Jacks, head-butt the budgie and crank up the volume till you acquire a backing track of petrified screams from neighbours and innocent passers-by."

Clerk wrote that "There's nothing specially original about the music, but it's presented like nothing you've ever heard before."  Bushell also noted that "Initial impressions of sameness hide spicey thematic variations (violence, perversion, and general obnoxiousness) and lotsa strong no-frills addictiveness. Much of this rubbish is catchier than an iron hook in a bar-room brawl." Clerk noted the negative traits of the album being "Nowhere Man", whose backing vocals were too calm and bassy when they should be "snarling" and that the new version of "Let's Break the Law" as it had seemed "seems to have lost the fierce edge of the seven inch rendition."

Track listing

Personnel
Animal: Vocals
Magoo: Guitars
Winston: Bass
P.J. Drums

References

Sources
 
 

Anti-Nowhere League albums
1982 debut albums